Finished Fourth

George Lee Harris (January 15, 1933 – January 7, 2011) was a member of the first United States Olympic judo team. He was born in Kittrell, North Carolina.  He was a 10th dan in Judo. Harris began his judo career after 1952.  Harris while speaking at Jack Krystek's School of Judo stated he was initially a boxer before becoming a Judoka.

He was a two-time gold medalist in the Pan American Games (1960 and 1963), four-time United States National Champion (1957, 1958, ...), and six time Air Force Champion. He also trained at the Kodokan where he earned his blackbelt.

Harris had a long involvement with military judo in the United States Air Force, and later served as president of the United States Judo Association.

Mr. Harris starred in the late-1970s martial-arts film, "The Year of the Gentle Tiger", a forerunner to "The Karate Kid". He also appeared on talk shows and was twice a guest on "To Tell the Truth".

References

Sources
Nishioka, Hayward (2000) Judo: Heart and Soul Ohara Publications.

External links
 

1933 births
2011 deaths
Olympic judoka of the United States
Judoka at the 1964 Summer Olympics
People from Kittrell, North Carolina
American male judoka
Pan American Games medalists in judo
Pan American Games gold medalists for the United States
Judoka at the 1963 Pan American Games
Medalists at the 1963 Pan American Games